Dan Iliakis (born April 25, 1982) is a Canadian professional ice hockey defenceman. He most recently played with Örebro HK of the Swedish HockeyAllsvenskan. Iliakis' mother is Finnish.

Iliakis made his SM-liiga debut playing with SaiPa during the 2007–08 SM-liiga season.

References

External links

1982 births
Living people
Ässät players
Canadian expatriate ice hockey players in Finland
Canadian expatriate ice hockey players in Sweden
Canadian ice hockey defencemen
Canadian people of Finnish descent
Espoo Blues players
Mora IK players
Ontario Junior Hockey League players
Örebro HK players
SaiPa players
Wayne State Warriors men's ice hockey players
Sportspeople from Scarborough, Toronto
Ice hockey people from Toronto